The 1905 Paris–Roubaix was the tenth edition of the Paris–Roubaix, a classic one-day cycle race in France. The single day event was held on 23 April 1905 and stretched  from Paris to its end in a velodrome in Roubaix. The winner was Louis Trousselier from France.

Results

References

Paris–Roubaix
Paris-Roubaix
Paris-Roubaix
Paris-Roubaix